Asumbuo (Asubuo in local orthography; Asumboa or Asuboa in some sources) is a nearly extinct language spoken on the island of Utupua, in the easternmost province of the Solomon Islands.

Affiliation
Like the two other languages of Utupua (Tanimbili and Amba), Asumbuo belongs to the Temotu subgroup of the Oceanic family, itself part of the Austronesian phylum.

Language vitality
With only about 10 speakers, Asumbuo is a highly endangered language. Together with its neighbour Tanimbili, it is currently being replaced by Amba (or Nebao), the main language of Utupua.

References

Bibliography
.

Languages of the Solomon Islands
Temotu languages
Endangered Austronesian languages
Severely endangered languages